Santovenia de la Valdoncina is a municipality located in the province of León, Castile and León, Spain. According to the 2004 census (INE), the municipality has a population of 1,774 inhabitants.

Towns 
Quintana de Raneros; Ribaseca; Santovenia de la Valdoncina; Villacedré; Villanueva del Carnero

References

Municipalities in the Province of León